Hoseynabad-e Latka (also Romanized as Ḩoseynābād-e Latkā; also known as Hosein Abad Chahar Bolook, Ḩoseynābād, Ḩoseynābād-e Kārkhāneh-ye Qand, and Husainābād) is a village in Mohajeran Rural District, Lalejin District, Bahar County, Hamadan Province, Iran. At the 2006 census, its population was 991, in 230 families.

References 

Populated places in Bahar County